When It's All Over We Still Have to Clear Up is the second album by the Scottish-Northern Irish indie rock band Snow Patrol, released on 24 April 2001 in the UK and 5 March in the US.

The album charted at number 129 in the UK and failed to sell well upon its initial release, but its re-release saw it eventually go gold in the UK.

Background
The album was to be titled Santa Maria, and by June 2000, newer material like "Chased By... I Don't Know What", "Black and Blue" and "One Night is Not Enough" was making its way into live performances. However, the album's release was held over for six months. Gary Lightbody used this time to write more songs. "Run", "Chocolate" and "Spitting Games" were written during this period, and later appeared on the next album Final Straw. On the tour following the release in March 2001, the band introduced "Run" to their audience, who received it very positively. In Lightbody's words: "I remember people's jaws dropping, and the applause going on for longer than any of our other songs."

Track listing

2006 re-release bonus tracks

All bonus tracks originally appeared as B-sides to the singles released from "When It's All Over We Still Have to Clear Up".

2019 remaster bonus tracks

Reception

Hot Press Fiona Reid's review of the album was extremely favourable, who found the album had plenty of "magical moments". She felt that the album "reaches a quiet place within the chaos", and declared it was a "classic". She rated the album 11 out of 12. It was ranked #50 in CMJ New Music Top 75 in August 2001. Scott Juba of the website The Trades also praised the album, describing it along with its predecessor Songs For Polarbears as 'wonderful', giving special acclaim to the track 'An Olive Grove Facing The Sea'.

Personnel
Snow Patrol
Gary Lightbody - vocals, guitar, piano, keyboards, backing vocals
Mark McClelland - bass guitar, piano, keyboards, extra vocals on track 7
Jonny Quinn - drums, extra vocals on track 7
Other personnel
Liam Saunders - electric piano on track 3
Mick Cooke - flugelhorn, trumpet on track 3
Stuart Murdoch - piano on tracks 6, 14
Kevin Lynch - extra vocals on track 7
Rob Dillam - feedback guitar on track 8; acoustic guitar on track 11
Richard Colburn - percussion on track 9 
Fly by Heart - choir on track 11
John Todd - trumpet on track 11
Peter Harvey - cello on track 12
David Burke - viola on track 12
Caroline Evans - violin on track 12
Michael Brennan, Jr. - producer

Peak positions and certifications

References

2001 albums
Snow Patrol albums
Jeepster Records albums